Griswold Creek is a stream in San Benito County, California. Its head is at the confluence of Pimental Creek and Vallecitos Creek.

References 

Rivers of San Benito County, California